Spinoaequalis is an extinct genus of diapsid reptile.

The 30 cm (1 ft) long creature, known from fossils found in Kansas, United States, was one of the first diapsids, along with Petrolacosaurus. It was also the first reptile to return to the water, evolving shortly after Hylonomus, the oldest confirmed reptile. Spinoaequalis was not fully aquatic, frequently returning to dry land. It probably swam using its laterally flattened, fanned tail. Its name means "symmetrical spine" referring to its deep, laterally compressed tail. Spinoaequalis has been found along with beautifully preserved marine fish, suggesting it occasionally left fresh water streams for the sea.

Spinoaequalis was described and named by Michael deBraga and Robert Reisz in 1995.

References

Carboniferous reptiles of North America
Prehistoric reptile genera
Prehistoric diapsids